Bobrowska may refer to the following villages in Poland:
Kuźnica Bobrowska in Gmina Grabów, Ostrzeszów County
Ignacówka Bobrowska in Gmina Głowaczów, Kozienice County
Bobrowska Wola in Gmina Kluczewsko, Włoszczowa County
Kolonia Bobrowska Wola in Gmina Kluczewsko, Włoszczowa County